Dżem is a blues rock band formed in Tychy, Poland. Ryszard Riedel, one of the most famous vocalists from Poland, worked with the band. Their songs include: "Czerwony jak cegła" (Red as a Brick), "Whisky", "Wehikuł czasu" (Time Machine), "Sen o Victorii" (Dream about Victoria), "Harley mój" (My Harley), "Mała aleja róż" (Little Rose Avenue), "Naiwne pytania" (Sappy questions), "List do M." (Letter to M.) and many more. They were the back-up band for Eric Clapton's concert in Gdynia on 14 August 2008.

Name 
The band's name comes from English word jam session which has the same spelling pronunciation as the Polish word for "jam" in the sense of a fruit preserve. The band's original name was "Jam" but before one of their concerts a woman made a mistake when she wrote their name, writing "Dżem".

Band members

Current line-up
 Adam Otręba – guitars, vocals (1973–present)
 Benedykt "Beno" Otręba – bass guitar, vocals (1973–1976, 1980–present)
 Jerzy Styczyński – guitars (1979–present)
 Zbigniew Szczerbiński – drums (1992–present)
 Maciej Balcar – vocals (2001–present)
 Janusz Borzucki – keyboards (2005–present)

Former members
 Paweł Berger (deceased) – keyboards, vocals (1973–2005)
 Ryszard Riedel (deceased) – vocals (1973–1994)
 Leszek Faliński (deceased) – drums (1975–1980)
 Józef Adamiec – bass guitar (1976–1978)
 Tadeusz Faliński (deceased) – bass guitar (1978–1980)
 Michał Giercuszkiewicz – drums (1981–1986)
 Marek Kapłon – drums (1986–1991)
 Jerzy Piotrowski – drums (1991–1992)
 Jacek Dewódzki – vocals (1995–2001)

Timeline

Discography

Studio albums

Live albums

Compilation albums

Video albums

Filmography

References

External links 

 Official site

Polish rock music groups
Blues rock groups